Vladimir Mikhailovich Kostin (22 June 1921 in Moscow, Russia – 3 May 1994 in Moscow, Russia) was a Russian basketball referee. He has refereed in the 1952 Olympics, 1956 Olympics, 1976 Olympics, 1963 World Championship, 1959 Women's World Championship and many European Championships. In 2007, he was enshrined in the FIBA Hall of Fame.

References

External links
 FIBA Hall of Fame page on Kostin

1921 births
1994 deaths
Basketball players from Moscow
FIBA Hall of Fame inductees
Russian basketball people
Basketball referees
Soviet men's basketball players
Soviet basketball coaches
Soviet military personnel of World War II
Military personnel from Moscow